1st is the debut album by American rock band Streets, released in 1983 (see 1983 in music).



Track listing

Personnel
Steve Walsh – synthesizer, keyboard, lead vocals
Billy Greer – bass, vocals
Mike Slamer – guitar
Tim Gehrt – percussion, drums, vocals

Production
Neil Kernon - Engineer, Producer, Mixing
Ted Jensen - Mastering
Chuck Fedonczak - Assistant Engineer
Bruce Buchhalter - Assistant Engineer & Mixing Engineer
Basic tracks recorded at Axis Studios, GA
Overdubs and vocals recorded at Electric Lady Studios, New York, NY
Mastered at Sterling Sound
Art Direction - Karen Katz
Illustration - Willardson & White Studio

The album spent 11 weeks on the charts, while the single spent 5 weeks on the pop charts, and twelve weeks on the Mainstream Rock chart.

Charts
Album – Billboard (United States)

Singles – Billboard (United States)

References

External links
http://www.cduniverse.com/productinfo.asp?pid=5311893&style=music

Streets (band) albums
1983 debut albums
Albums produced by Neil Kernon
Atlantic Records albums